The following are the radio stations in the Syrian Arab Republic:

FM Radios
 Al-Madina FM (Website)
 Melody FM Syria (Website)
 Radio Arabesque FM (Website)
 Al Aan FM (Website)
 Radio Damascus (Website) ORTAS
 Sham FM (Website)
 Farah FM (Website)
 Fuse FM Syria (Website)
 Mix FM Syria (Website)
 Rotana Style FM (Website)
 Radio El-Karma (Website) Suweida, ORTAS 
 Radio Souryana (Website) ORTAS 
 Version FM (Website) Damascus 
 Ninar FM (Website) Aleppo
 Sada FM Syria (Website) Aleppo
 Radio Amwaj FM (Website) Lattakia, ORTAS 
 Radio 7la FM Lattakia 
 Radio Zenobia (Website) Homs, ORTAS 
 Radio Swaida (Website) Suweida
 Radio Rayan (Website) Suweida
 Shufi Mafi FM (Website) Deir ez-Zor/Raqqa
 Radio Orient (Website) (from Beirut, Lebanon), shut down in 2021
 Radio Fann FM (Website) (Jordanian, Syrian branch) 
 Radio Sout al Shabab (Website) ORTAS
 Radio Tartus (Website) Tartus, ORTAS
 Kurdish: 
 Arta FM (Website) 
 Radio One FM Syria Group (Website)
 Pro-Turkish: 
 Radio Alwan FM (from Istanbul, Turkey), shut down in December 2022
 Al-Asemeh Radio FM (Website), shut down December 2022
 Rozana Radio (Website) (from Gaziantep, Turkey), shut down in December 2022
 Hawa Smart FM (from Gaziantep,  Turkey), shut down in 2022
 Radio Hara FM (from Gaziantep,  Turkey), shut down in 2022
 Radio Free Syria : English-language web broadcast in Gaziantep, Turkey, shut down in 2023
 Radio Fresh : established in October 2014 in Kafr Nabl, broadcasting from Idlib
 Watan FM (from Istanbul, Turkey)

See also
Telecommunications in Syria

References

Syria
Radio in Syria